Ellis Ferreira and Rick Leach were the defending champions, but Leach did not participate this year.  Ferreira partnered Nicklas Kulti, losing in the quarterfinals.

Jonas Björkman and Patrick Rafter won the title, defeating Paul Haarhuis and Jared Palmer 6–3, 7–5 in the final.

Seeds

  Jonas Björkman /  Patrick Rafter (champions)
  Paul Haarhuis /  Jared Palmer (final)
  David Adams /  John-Laffnie de Jager (quarterfinals)
  Jiří Novák /  David Rikl (first round)

Draw

Draw

External links
Draw

1999 Gerry Weber Open